S.V. Deshpande was a freedom fighter and acting General Secretary of the Communist Party of India in 1931 to 1933 when others were in Meerut jail. And he was the president of AITUC from 1929 to 1931.

References

Communist Party of India politicians from Maharashtra